Mag-ingat Ka sa... Kulam or Kulam is a Filipino fantasy- horror film co-written and directed by Jun Lana and starring Judy Ann Santos and Dennis Trillo. It is produced and released by Regal Films as part of their year-long 48th anniversary celebration. The film was released domestically on October 1, 2008.
The film is about a married woman who starts behaving unpredictably as she recovers from a terrible car accident.

Mag-ingat Ka sa... Kulam is the first film among others to be officially released without charge on YouTube by Regal Entertainment, on May 2, 2020.

Plot
Ever since Mira (Judy Ann Santos) woke up from a car accident, she started seeing things that she could not explain. She felt paranormal activity is occurring inside their house. Although she could not remember anything that happened before the accident, Dave came to her house and explained to her that she was supposed to leave her husband, Paul and elope with him. Dave told her that she loved him and she trusted a secret to him. Mira learned that Paul had another lover before which caused their relationship to deteriorate. Even her blind child, Sophie seemed aloof and is scared of her. She started to patch things up between her and her family but she could not forget what Dave told her about trusting him her secret.
Mira called up Dave to meet him and Dave explained to her the secret she seemed to have forgotten. Dave told her how she had a twin sister named Maria that she left in a mental institute because she had been insane since their mother's death. Mira and Dave went to the mental institute to see Maria, but she committed suicide a month back and since no one claimed her body, they took the corpse to a university for study. She told Paul about this which surprised him, all along not knowing that Mira ever had a twin sister. Paul called the university to claim the corpse and then had it cremated.

Mira and Paul's daughter, Sophie, underwent an eye transplant. Sophie was so excited to see the upcoming eclipse as this is her first time to see again since she got blind. The moment she opened her eyes, she saw a woman standing behind her mother and the people around were wondering who she was seeing since no other people were there.

Paul and Mira could no longer take the paranormal activity so they decided to consult a medium to help them. The old medium told Mira and Paul that a powerful spell is to acquire a physical body on the eclipse when all spirits is at their most powerful. The medium found a doll which he called "antiguar", a powerful device that the bad spirit can use to let itself remain in this world.
On the night of the eclipse, Sophie and Paul were watching the phenomenon when Paul caught a glimpse of something white approaching them. It was Maria's body. He took Sophie inside the house and in her room, he found a tape which when he played in Sophie's video cam recorder, he saw it was recorded by Mira for him. The video showed Mira videotaping herself before the car accident she went through. Mira was saying in the tape how Paul could fight Maria. In the room where Mira was, her body became that of Maria. The twist was then revealed. It was Maria who came back from the car accident and it was Mira who died in the asylum and got cremated. Mira had been dead all along and it was Maria who used her body to come back to the world and take vengeance against Mira through her family.

Mira recalled that their mother was a mangkukulam (witch) and tried to transfer her powers to the twins when they were young. Being the braver one, Mira tried to contradict their mother's chants as she did not want to learn about her evil doings and voodoo magic. When the twins grew up, Mira decided to run away from home, leaving Maria behind. Their mother died soon after. Mira attended the burial and thinking that Maria had gone insane, claiming she could talk to things that Mira could not see. Mira then told her twin that she would bring her with her to Manila. It turned out though that Mira would send her to a mental institute. Maria was left heartbroken. One night, she stayed up late and did the aforementioned spell so that her and Mira's soul could switch. The chant was effective, but when Maria's soul transferred to Mira's body (who was on the way to the mental asylum to stop Maria from doing any harm to her family) the car got into a horrible accident. Maria, who woke up in Mira's body could no longer remember anything while Mira who found herself in Maria's body woke up from the trance already in the asylum.

In the present, Paul replayed the video tape that Mira left for him. Mira said that by the time that Paul got to watch the video, she would have been dead. Paul needed to trap Maria into a circle made of Mira's body's dust. Paul did this but Maria discovers the trick. She was then pushed by Sophie in the circle of dust. Paul stabbed the "antiguar" with a piece of wood and Maria's soul burned and disappeared. Mira's soul showed up to the father and daughter to bid her final farewell. It is hinted at the end that Mira's daughter Sophie saw the book that was use for "kulam".

Cast

Reception

Critical response
The film received an "A" rating from the Cinema Evaluation Board.

Box Office
The film was a box office success. The film grossed P43.3 million on its opening weekend, and grossed P87.4 million for its entire theatrical run.

Accolades
6th Golden Screen Awards 
 Best Visual Effects: Roadrunner Network, Inc.
25th PMPC Star Awards for Movies 
 Movie of the Year
 Movie Director of the Year: Jun Lana
 Movie Actress of the Year: Judy Ann Santos
 Movie Child Performer of the Year: Sharlene San Pedro
 Original Movie Screenplay of the Year: Jun Lana, Elmer Gatchalian and Renato Custodio
 Movie Cinematographer of the Year: Moises Zee
 Movie Editor of the Year: Ria De Guzman, Renewin Alano & Mikael Angelo Pestano
 Movie Production Designer of the Year: Mario Lipit & Edgar Martin Littaua
 Movie Sound Engineer of the Year: Bebet Casas
11th Gawad Pasado Awards 
 Pinakapasadong Editing (Best Editing): Ria de Guzman, Renewin Alano at Angelo Pestano
 Pinakapasadong Tunog (Best Sound): Bebet Casas
27th FAP Luna Awards 
 Best Musical Scoring: Von de Guzman

See also
List of ghost films

References

External links

2008 films
2008 horror films
Philippine horror films
Philippine ghost films
Witchcraft in Philippine films
Regal Entertainment films
2000s Tagalog-language films
Films directed by Jun Robles Lana